Weldon is a city in Clarke and Decatur counties of the U.S. state of Iowa. The population was 136 at the time of the 2020 census.

History
Weldon got its start in the year 1880, following construction of the Humeston and Shenandoah Railroad through the territory.  The Weldon Depot, which operated from 1881 to 1946, was listed on the National Register of Historic Places in 1991.

Geography
Weldon is located at  (40.897946, -93.734048).

The town is divided by the Clarke-Decatur county line — one half in Clarke County, and the other half in Decatur County.

Demographics

2010 census
As of the census of 2010, there were 125 people, 54 households, and 31 families living in the city. The racial makeup of the city was 99.2% White and 0.8% Native American. Hispanic or Latino of any race were 1.6% of the population.

There were 54 households, of which 25.9% had children under the age of 18 living with them, 44.4% were married couples living together, 5.6% had a female householder with no husband present, 7.4% had a male householder with no wife present, and 42.6% were non-families. 38.9% of all households were made up of individuals, and 18.5% had someone living alone who was 65 years of age or older. The average household size was 2.31 and the average family size was 3.06.

The median age in the city was 46.4 years. 20.8% of residents were under the age of 18; 8% were between the ages of 18 and 24; 16.8% were from 25 to 44; 38.4% were from 45 to 64; and 16% were 65 years of age or older. The gender makeup of the city was 50.4% male and 49.6% female.

2000 census
As of the census of 2000, there were 145 people, 60 households, and 39 families living in the city. The racial makeup of the city was 100.00% White. Hispanic or Latino of any race were 2.07% of the population.

There were 60 households, out of which 33.3% had children under the age of 18 living with them, 53.3% were married couples living together, 6.7% had a female householder with no husband present, and 35.0% were non-families. 33.3% of all households were made up of individuals, and 20.0% had someone living alone who was 65 years of age or older. The average household size was 2.42 and the average family size was 3.10.

In the city, the population was spread out, with 27.6% under the age of 18, 6.9% from 18 to 24, 29.7% from 25 to 44, 17.9% from 45 to 64, and 17.9% who were 65 years of age or older. The median age was 37 years. For every 100 females, there were 93.3 males. For every 100 females age 18 and over, there were 87.5 males.

The median income for a household in the city was $28,750, and the median income for a family was $29,205. Males had a median income of $28,250 versus $20,313 for females. The per capita income for the city was $11,315. There were 12.2% of families and 14.4% of the population living below the poverty line, including 28.0% of under eighteens and none of those over 64.

References

Cities in Iowa
Cities in Clarke County, Iowa
Cities in Decatur County, Iowa